On 13 October 2022, a bus transporting Syrian Army personnel in the village of Al-Sabboura in the Rif Dimashq governorate, was blown up in an IED explosion. The explosion killed at least 18 Syrian military personnel and wounded a further 27. The attack was the deadliest attack near the Syrian capital, Damascus, since a similar attack in 2021.

No group immediately claimed responsibility.

References 

2022 in the Syrian civil war
Improvised explosive device bombings in 2022
October 2022 events in Asia
Bus bombings in Asia
Mass murder in 2022
Improvised explosive device bombings in Syria
Terrorist incidents in Syria in 2022